Hoffmannola hansi is a species of air-breathing sea slug, a shell-less marine pulmonate gastropod mollusk in the family Onchidiidae.

Description
In the original description of Hoffmannola hansi the authors Eveline Marcus and Ernst Marcus examine different specimens, noting that "The biggest slug is 48mm long measured over the back (26mm lineal), 20 mm broad and 16 mm high."

The species is named after the German zoologist Hans Hoffmann.

Distribution
Hoffmannola hansi is a species of air-breathing sea slug, a species which occurs in the Pacific coast of Mexican, from the Gulf of California (Baja California Norte, Sonora, Sinaloa) to Oaxaca.

References

External links
 
 http://www.marinespecies.org/aphia.php?p=taxdetails&id=446165

Onchidiidae
Gastropods described in 1967